Rowdy Gaari Pellam is a 1991 Indian Telugu-language film directed by K. S. Prakash Rao and produced by  Mohan Babu. The film stars Mohan Babu and Shobana. The film was a remake of the 1989 Tamil film Pudhea Paadhai, starring Parthiban and Seetha.

Plot 
Mohan Babu is a street thug doing petty crimes for a local corrupt politician. The film is about how the street thug (rowdy) ends up being a good samaritan because of his "wife", who he marries after raping her for money offered by villains.

Cast 
 Mohan Babu as Rambabu
 Shobana as Anjali
 Narra Venkateswara Rao
 Kota Srinivasa Rao
 Prasad Babu as Anjali's elder brother
 Annapoorna
 Brahmanandam
 Rajitha
 Hema
 Jayalalita in song Yama Ranju

Soundtrack 

The music was composed by Bappi Lahiri.

References

External links 
 

1991 films
Films scored by Bappi Lahiri
Telugu remakes of Tamil films
1990s Telugu-language films
Films directed by K. S. Prakash Rao